BR Standard Class 3 may refer to:

 BR Standard Class 3 2-6-0
 BR Standard Class 3 2-6-2T